Donald Martin is a Canadian and American screenwriter. He is most noted for the film Never Too Late, for which he was nominated for a Writers Guild of Canada Award and received a Genie Award nomination for Best Original Screenplay at the 17th Genie Awards in 1996, and as the recipient of the Margaret Collier Award, a lifetime achievement award for his body of work in television, at Canada's 25th Gemini Awards in 2010.

He was also the inaugural recipient of the Academy of Canadian Cinema & Television's Humanitarian Award in 2001, in honor of his work as a sponsor and supporter of Foster Parents Plan of Canada. In 2002, he received Her Majesty Queen Elizabeth’s Golden Jubilee Medal for his contribution to the arts and his philanthropy.

His other credits include The Christmas Choir, Dim Sum Funeral for HBO Films, Too Late to Say Goodbye, Céline, The Craigslist Killer, Bomb Girls: Facing the Enemy, Milton's Secret, Isabelle, Toto, Queen Bees and the Netflix movie Brazen. He was nominated for the prestigious 2022 Humanitas Prize for his screenplay Queen Bees.

His first production in 1988 was the drama No Blame, the first movie to deal with AIDS from a woman's point of view. No Blame was invited by the World Health Organization to screen at the 5th International AIDS Conference and the movie won several international awards, including Prince Albert's Red Cross Award at the Monte Carlo Film & Television Festival (1989).

He is a member of the Writers Guild of America West, the Writers Guild of Canada, the Television Academy (U.S.), the British Academy of Film & Television Arts, and the Academy of Canadian Cinema & Television.

References

External links

20th-century Canadian screenwriters
20th-century Canadian male writers
21st-century Canadian screenwriters
21st-century Canadian male writers
Canadian male screenwriters
Canadian television writers
Canadian Screen Award winners
Living people
Year of birth missing (living people)